The Church of the Presentation of Mary in Popovac is a Serbian Orthodox church in eastern Croatia. The exact date of the construction of the church is unknown with dates ranging from 1726 (wooden inscription kept at the church), local judge report noting that the foundations were built in 1767 and Baranya County statistical report in 1757 mention the church in the village. The building was reconstructed between 1905 and 1912. Today, it is one of the three Serbian Orthodox churches in the municipality.

See also
 Eparchy of Osječko polje and Baranja
 Serbs of Croatia
 List of Serbian Orthodox churches in Croatia
 Church of St. George, Kneževo

References

18th-century Serbian Orthodox church buildings
Popovac
Register of Cultural Goods of the Republic of Croatia